Paradise FC International is a Grenadian football club from Paradise, Saint Andrew Parish that plays in the Grenada Premier Division. They have won the league championship on five occasions.

Honours
 GFA Premier League:
 Champions (5): 2005, 2007, 2010, 2014, 2018–19
 Runners-up (7): 2003, 2004, 2011, 2012, 2013, 2015, 2017
 GFA Super Knockout Cup:
 Champions (4): 2009, 2012, 2015, 2016

References

External links

Football clubs in Grenada
Association football clubs established in 1998